Platnickopoda is a small genus of east African huntsman spiders. It was first described by Peter Jäger in 2020, and it has only been found in Tanzania.  it contains only two species: P. normani and P. saccata.

See also
 Rhitymna
 List of Sparassidae species

References

Further reading

Sparassidae genera
Arthropods of Tanzania